Timeline of the War of 1812

Origins

War

1812

1813

1814

1815

See also
 List of War of 1812 Battles

References

External links
Timeline 1
Timeline 2
Timeline 3
Timeline 4
Timeline 5
Timeline 6
Timeline 7
Timeline 8

United States military history timelines